Veena Poovu can refer to:

 "Veena Poovu" (poem), a 1907 Malayalam poem by Indian poet Kumaran Asan